The 1968 Giro d'Italia was the 51nd edition of the Giro d'Italia, one of cycling's Grand Tours. The field consisted of 130 riders, and 90 riders finished the race.

By rider

By nationality
The 130 riders that competed in the 1968 Giro d'Italia represented 11 different countries.

References 

1968 Giro d'Italia
1968